Ian Masters is an Australian-born American broadcast journalist, commentator, author, screenwriter and documentary filmmaker.

Masters hosted the KPFK, Pacifica Radio program Background Briefing which deals with American politics, foreign policy as well as domestic American security issues.  Masters has hosted a once weekly episode of Background Briefing since 1980; in 2009, the program was expanded to five days per week. It is broadcast on more than forty radio stations across the US, and is also available as a podcast.

Masters resigned from his position hosting "Background Briefing" at KPFK and now produces the show at his home in Santa Monica as an online podcast. His shows are no longer aired on FM radio station KPFK.

Masters was formerly a Senior Fellow at the Center for Strategic and International Affairs based at UCLA, and a Senior Fellow at the Center for International Relations at UCLA. He also served as a consultant to the Center for National Security Studies at Los Alamos National Laboratory.

He hosted the 2005 PEN Center USA Awards from Los Angeles, California, which has in the past honored those such as Gore Vidal, Ursula K. Le Guin, Charlie Kaufman, and Robert Alter.  On September 18, 2007, Masters moderated a discussion billed as "The Israel Lobby and US Foreign Policy" with John J. Mearscheimer and Stephen M. Walt. The event was part of the Hammer Forum held at UCLA's Hammer Museum. On September 25, 2007, Masters moderated a panel discussion on "Foreign Policy after the Bush Administration". The event was also held at UCLA's Hammer Museum. Panelists included John Brady Kiesling, John B. Judis, Christopher O'Sullivan and Steven Clemons.

Personal life
Masters is married to British-American actress Christina Pickles.

References

External links

American public radio personalities
American radio news anchors
Living people
American political journalists
Journalists from California
Radio personalities from Los Angeles
Writers from Los Angeles
Ian
Australian emigrants to the United States
20th-century American journalists
American male journalists
21st-century American journalists
Year of birth missing (living people)
Place of birth missing (living people)